Smyser and English Pharmacy, also known as Leedom & Wissler Pharmacy, is a historic pharmacy building located in the Germantown neighborhood of Philadelphia, Pennsylvania. It was built in 1886–1887, and is a three-story, three bay rectangular brick building in the Queen Anne-style. It had a ground floor pharmacy, with offices and residences above. It features an ornamental cornice and terra cotta decorative details.  The interior features ornate tiled fireplaces.  It housed a pharmacy until 1997.

It was added to the National Register of Historic Places in 2002.

References

Commercial buildings on the National Register of Historic Places in Philadelphia
Queen Anne architecture in Pennsylvania
Commercial buildings completed in 1887
Germantown, Philadelphia
1887 establishments in Pennsylvania
Pharmacies on the National Register of Historic Places